The Evans VP-1 Volksplane is an American designed aircraft for amateur construction. The aircraft was designed by former Convair, Ryan Aircraft and General Dynamics aeronautical engineer William Samuel Evans of La Jolla, California.

Design and development
In 1966, Evans  began engineering work on the VP-1, choosing an all-wood, strut-braced open-cockpit single-seat low-wing design for ease in amateur construction. Designed to be simple to build and safe to fly, performance and appearance is of secondary importance. To make construction simple, marine grade plywood is used for the slab-sided fuselage structure. The wings are designed to be detachable to allow the aircraft to transported by road.

The VP-1 was designed specifically to utilize a modified VW Type 1 automotive engine from the VW Beetle. The fuselage is built in a warren truss arrangement where the exterior plywood takes the diagonal stress loads, therefore eliminating the diagonal members to maintain simplicity. The vertical and upright members are staggered to keep the joints as simple as possible. The wing is of a forward and aft blank spar design which uses stack-cut plywood ribs of equal size in order to keep construction time down. The ailerons are hinged directly behind the aft spar. For simplicity no flaps are provided. The wings and tail surfaces are fabric covered.

Because the design lacks aerodynamic refinement, the Volksplane requires more power than most aircraft its weight to fly. Some builders have altered the fuselage design to improve the aerodynamics and aesthetics.

The design was developed into a two-seat version, the Evans VP-2, with an enlarged cockpit although this variant is no longer being offered.

Operational history
The Volksplane first flew in September 1968. Offered as a set of plans, and marketed as a "fun" aircraft, the Volksplane was immediately popular with home builders who saw it as an inexpensive and easy-to build project. A number of examples have been built with variations in the design. In 1973, Mohog, a mahogany-skinned Volksplane, with further modifications to the basic design incorporating monocoque wings, strengthened roll bar and a blown bubble canopy, was built by the Wosika family of El Cajon, California, at a cost of $3,000.

Construction of the Volksplane is relatively straightforward, and, according to some home builders, almost like building a "giant model aircraft". Flying characteristics are relatively benign, as the intent was to create a simple, and easy-to-fly aircraft. Although not intended to be an aerobatic design, gentle "aileron rolls, lazy eights, wingovers, chandelles and steep stalls" have been conducted. A total of approximately 6,000 plans have been sold to date.

Variants

Evans VP-1
Single-seat homebuilt
Evans VP-2
Two-seat homebuilt

Specifications (VP-1 – 40 hp engine)

See also

References

Notes

Bibliography

 Bayerl, Robby, Martin Berkemeier et al. World Directory of Leisure Aviation 2011–12. Lancaster UK: WDLA UK, 2011. .
 Jackson, A.J. British Civil Aircraft since 1919, Volume 2. London: Putnam, 1974. .
 Purdy, Don: AeroCrafter – Homebuilt Aircraft Sourcebook, Fifth Edition. Chatswood, New South Wales, Australia: BAI Communications, 1998. .
 Tacke, Willi, Marino Boric et al. World Directory of Light Aviation 2015–16. Ivry sur Seine, France: Flying Pages Europe SARL, 2015. .
 Taylor, John W. R. Jane's All The World's Aircraft 1982–83. London: Jane's Yearbooks, 1982. .

Homebuilt aircraft
1960s United States sport aircraft
Low-wing aircraft
Single-engined tractor aircraft
Evans aircraft
Aircraft first flown in 1968